Pierre Bürcher (born 20 December 1945) is a Swiss prelate of the Catholic Church who is currently serving as apostolic administrator of the Diocese of Chur. He was Bishop of Reykjavík, Iceland, from 2007 to 2015.

Biography
Pierre Bürcher was born on 20 December 1945 in Fiesch, Switzerland. He was ordained a priest on 27 March 1971. After filling a variety of pastoral assignments, he spent the year 1989–90 studying clerical formation and then became rector of the major seminary of the Lausanne Diocese from 1990 to 1994.

On 3 February 1994, Pope John Paul II appointed him Titular bishop of Maximiana in Byzacena and auxiliary bishop of the Diocese of Lausanne, Genève and Fribourg. He received his episcopal consecration on 12 March. His tenure as episcopal vicar for the Canton of Vaud was marked by a longstanding dispute about personnel as the authorities with financial control did not support the staffing his pastoral program required. The bishop of the Diocese eventually relieved him of his responsibilities for the Canton.

On 30 October 2007, Pope Benedict XVI appointed him Bishop of Reykjavík. John Paul had made him a member of the Congregation for the Oriental Churches in 2004, and Pope Francis confirmed his membership for another five-year term in 2014. In 2010 he participated in the Synod of Bishops on the Church in the Middle East.

Pope Francis accepted his resignation on 18 September 2015, at the age of 69, because of health problems linked to volcanic dust. In retirement he lived in Jerusalem and spent part of the year accompanying pilgrimages.

On 20 May 2019, Francis appointed him apostolic administrator of the Diocese of Chur, Switzerland.

See also
Roman Catholicism in Iceland
Christianity in Iceland

References

External links

Roman Catholic Church in Iceland 

21st-century Roman Catholic bishops in Switzerland
21st-century Roman Catholic bishops in Iceland
1945 births
Living people
Roman Catholic bishops of Reykjavík